William Sherwin may refer to:

William Sherwin (minister) (1607?–1687?), English minister
William Sherwin (engraver) (1645?–1709?), English engraver
William Sherwin (Australian settler) (1763–1822)
 William Sherwin (cricketer) (1839–1873), English cricketer